Said Rasjad (EYD: Said Rasyad) Served as Acting Mayor of Padang, Bupati of Agam, and Regent of Padang Pariaman.

Said Rasjad completed his MULO education in Padang and continued to an Algemene Middelbare School in Batavia. After graduating, Said worked as a teacher.

On November 27, 1945 at School of Simpang Haru (Kageo Gakko, former Ambacht School, now SMK) the Padang Area Incident or Simpang Haru Incident occurred. The incident started with the forced occupation of the school by KNIL soldiers.  This led to protests from Said Rasjad, who was a teacher and principal. KNIL soldiers then forcibly beaten Said Rasjad until he was incapacitated. This sparked resistance from the Republicans at the school and in the evening a group of youths attacked the soldiers at the school.

Said was appointed Mayor of Padang in 1947 after the previous mayor, Bagindo Azizchan was killed by Dutch forces, and then during the war he moved his government seat to Padangpanjang. But then the Dutch appointed Abdoel Hakim, to mayor of Padang.

Said Rasjad was appointed as Military Regent of Agam from 1949 to 1950 replacing the Military Regent Dahlan Djambek. He was then appointed Regent of Padang Pariaman from 1950 to 1953.

References

External links 
 

Mayors of Padang
Minangkabau people
Mayors of places in Indonesia